Alessandro Bianchi (born 19 July 1989) is a former San Marino international footballer who played mainly as a right winger, but also as a forward and midfielder.

International career
He made his senior debut on 14 August 2012, in a 3–2 defeat to Malta.

References

External links

1989 births
Living people
Sammarinese footballers
San Marino international footballers
Association football forwards